Nagyvisnyó is a village and municipality in northern Hungary, in Heves county, northwest of the Bükk Mountains, in the valley of Bán-patak. Until 1950, the village was part of Borsod county.

Popular ski resort Bánkút is situated within municipality limits.

Monuments

The Baroque Protestant church was built around 1800; its cassetted ceiling was made in 1804.

Populated places in Heves County